The identifiable victim effect is the tendency of individuals to offer greater aid when a specific, identifiable person ("victim") is observed under hardship, as compared to a large, vaguely defined group with the same need. 

The identifiable victim effect has two components. People are more inclined to help an identified victim than an unidentified one, and people are more inclined to help a single victim than a group of victims. Although helping an identified victim may be commendable, the identifiable victim effect is considered a cognitive bias. From a consequentialist point of view, the cognitive error is the failure to offer N times as much help to N unidentified victims.

The identifiable victim effect has a mirror image that is sometimes called the identifiable perpetrator effect. Research has shown that individuals are more inclined to mete out punishment, even at their own expense, when they are punishing a specific, identified perpetrator.

The conceptualization of the identifiable victim effect as it is known today is commonly attributed to American economist Thomas Schelling. He wrote that harm to a particular person invokes “anxiety and sentiment, guilt and awe, responsibility and religion, [but]…most of this awesomeness disappears when we deal with statistical death”.

Historical figures from Joseph Stalin to Mother Teresa are credited with statements that epitomize the identifiable victim effect. The remark "One death is a tragedy; a million deaths is a statistic" is widely, although probably incorrectly, attributed to Stalin. The remark "If I look at the mass I will never act. If I look at the one, I will," is attributed to Mother Teresa.

Examples and evidence

Examples
This article mentions many historical incidents that have been cited as examples of the identifiable victim effect. These incidents serve as illustrative examples but do not constitute evidence that the effect exists.

Arrest of Rosa Parks
The conviction of Rosa Parks in 1955 for refusing to give up her bus seat in favor of a White passenger inspired the Black community to boycott the Montgomery, Alabama buses for over a year. Parks appealed her conviction, but her case never reached the U.S. Supreme Court. The Court found bus segregation unconstitutional in Browder v. Gayle, a case with four plaintiffs.

Parks became a symbol of resistance to racial segregation in the United States. Upon her death in 2005, the nation mourned and honored her. At about the same time, the U.S. Congress stripped $50 million from a bill that would have funded peacekeeping efforts in Darfur, where genocide was claiming hundreds of thousands of lives.

'Baby Jessica' in the well
On October 14, 1987, 18-month old Jessica McClure fell into a narrow well in her aunt's backyard in Midland, Texas. Within hours, 'Baby Jessica', as she became known, made headlines around the US. The public reacted with sympathy towards her ordeal. While teams of rescue workers, paramedics and volunteers worked to successfully rescue 'Baby Jessica' in 58 hours, the public donated hundreds of thousands of dollars to her family. Even after Jessica was discharged from the hospital, the McClure family was flooded with cards and gifts from members of the public as well as a visit from then-Vice President George H.W. Bush and a telephone call from then-President Ronald Reagan.

Drowning of Alan Kurdi
In September, 2015, three-year-old Syrian refugee Alan (or Aylan) Kurdi drowned when he and his family tried to reach Europe by boat. A photograph of Kurdi's body caused a dramatic upturn in international concern over the refugee crisis. The picture has been credited with causing a surge in donations to charities helping migrants and refugees, with one charity, the Migrant Offshore Aid Station, recording a 15-fold increase in donations within 24 hours of its publication.

Murder of George Floyd
The murder of George Floyd by a police officer in May, 2020 led to worldwide protests against police brutality. Almost 1,000 people are killed in the U.S. by police every year, and a black male is 2.5 times as likely to be killed by police as a white male. The reader is invited to introspect and consider if he or she is a thousand times more outraged by a thousand annual killings than by the murder of George Floyd.

Summary of experimental evidence
A meta-analysis of studies through 2015 of the identifiable victim effect found that not all studies achieve statistical significance, and the effect size, in general, is small. However, in some cases the experimental manipulations are subtle. For example, Small and Loewenstein found that when the victim is identified only by a number, subjects are more inclined to help the victim if they know the victim's number when they decide whether to help than if they learn the number later.

For what victims is the effect strongest? 
The meta-analysis of studies through 2015 found that statistical significance is enhanced and the effect size is increased under the following circumstances:
 if the identified victim is a child
 if a photograph of the victim is shown
 if the victim's plight is caused by poverty rather than disease or injury
 if the victim is perceived as not responsible for his/her plight
The identifiable victim effect disappears when a group of victims, rather than a single victim, is identified.

The identifiable victim effect motivates helping the identified victim and helping others in similar circumstances, but it may not motivate helping oneself. Research conducted during the COVID-19 pandemic found that the effect of identifiable victims in public health messaging had either no meaningful effect or a reverse identifiable victim effect on pro-health behaviors such as hand-washing, mask-wearing, and staying at home.

Relation to other cognitive biases 
The preference for helping a single individual rather than a group is sometimes called the singularity effect. Indifference to the number of individuals helped is called scope neglect or scope insensitivity.

The identifiable victim effect has a mirror image that is sometimes called the identifiable perpetrator effect.
Research has shown that individuals are more inclined to mete out punishment, even at their own expense, when they are punishing a specific, identified perpetrator. They also exert more severe punishments and express stronger feelings of blame and anger. Even when the perpetrator is identified only by a number, subjects are more inclined to punish if they know the perpetrator’s number when they decide whether to punish than if they learn the number later.

This effect has also been called the “Goldstein effect,” after the fictional Emmanuel Goldstein, who was vilified as the supposed enemy of the state in George Orwell’s novel 1984.

These two effects, of identifiable victims and identifiable perpetrators, suggest that there is a more general identifiable other effect, such that any identified individual evokes a stronger reaction than an equivalent but unidentified individual.

Explanations 

Researchers  have proposed various explanations of the identifiable victim effect, which may work together to produce the effect. These explanations are given below, and experimental tests of the explanations are cited.

Emotional reactions 

According to the affect heuristic, people make decisions based on emotions rather than objective analysis. A single identified victim may trigger a stronger emotional response than a group of unidentified victims. Several studies have found that identified victims evoke more sympathy and more willingness to help than statistical victims.

Paul Slovic argued that our compassion fades as the number of victims increases, and eventually collapses. He and his colleagues found that experimental subjects donated less to help two starving children than to help one.

Relative size of the reference group 

Risk that is concentrated is perceived as greater than the same risk dispersed over a wider population. Identifiable victims are their own reference group; if they do not receive aid then the entire reference group will perish. For example, Fetherstonhaugh et al found that an intervention saving a fixed number of lives was considered less beneficial when more total lives were at risk.

Jenni and Loewenstein's experimental subjects showed significantly more support for risk-reducing actions when a higher proportion of the reference group was at risk. This effect was so striking that Jenni and Loewenstein suggested that the identifiable victim effect could instead be called the “percentage of reference group saved effect”.

Perceived responsibility 

People tend to feel more responsibility for victims who are psychologically closer to them, and people may feel closer to an identified victim. Indeed, several studies have found that individuals feel more responsibility for an identified victim.

Ex post vs ex ante evaluation 

The decision to save an identifiable victim is made ex post, after the victim is in danger. In contrast, the decision to save a statistical victim is often made ex ante, to prevent the individual from being in danger. People may feel a responsibility to an actual identified victim but not to a possible victim of a future tragedy that might not occur. This explanation is closest to what Thomas Schelling implied in his now-famous paper.

Jenni and Loewenstein (1997) did not find evidence that ex post vs ex ante evaluation contributes to the identifiable victim effect, but Small and Lowenstein (2003) did.

Vividness 
Information that identifies a victim may include vivid details such as photographs, video, and a description of the victim's predicament. The victim may be portrayed as innocent and helpless. These details evoke emotional responses and provide a sense of familiarity and social closeness. Therefore, identified victims may elicit greater support than statistical victims. 

Studies have found that people respond more to concrete, graphic information than abstract, statistical information. Bohnet and Frey (1999) and Kogut and Ritov (2005) found that vividness contributes to the identifiable victim effect. Another study by Kogut and Ritov (2005) found that donations to benefit a needy child increased when the name and a picture of the child were provided. Jenni and Loewenstein (1997) did not observe an effect of vividness.

Identified vs statistical victims 
Some researchers have contrasted an identified victim not with unidentified victims but with statistical victims. They have generally found that identified victims are more likely to be helped than statistical ones.
For example, Small, Loewenstein, and Slovic found that subjects donated much more money to help a single starving girl named Rokia than to relieve a famine described statistically.

In one of Jenni and Loewenstein's two experiments comparing certain and uncertain deaths, their subjects were significantly more concerned about certain deaths.

Implications

Public policy

Healthcare 

The identifiable victim effect may also influence healthcare, both at the individual and national level. On the individual level, doctors are more likely to recommend expensive, but potentially life-saving, treatments to an individual patient rather than to a group of patients. This effect is not limited to medical professionals, as laymen demonstrate this same bias towards providing more expensive treatments for individual patients. On the national level, the American people are far more likely to contribute to an expensive treatment to save the life of one person rather than spend much smaller amounts on preventative measures that could save the lives of thousands per year. A function of American individualism, this nationwide bias towards expensive treatments is still prevalent today.

Ryan White Care Act 
The need to tackle the problems faced by AIDS sufferers was brought to the political forefront as a result of the legal and social plight of one particular AIDS victim, Ryan White, who contracted HIV at age 13 and died of AIDS six years later. His circumstances and his campaign for greater funding for AIDS research were widely publicised in the media. Following his death in 1990, the US Congress passed the Ryan White Care Act, which funded the largest set of services for people living with AIDS in the country.

Criminal justice 

Since the identifiable victim effect can influence punishment, it has the potential to undermine the system of trial by jury. Jurors, when deliberating, work with an identifiable alleged perpetrator, and thus may attach negative emotions (e.g. disgust, anger) to the individual or assign increased blame when handing down a harsh sentence. Policymakers, who are unable to see the individual offender, being almost entirely emotionally removed, may actually have intended a more lenient sentence. This may produce a harsher verdict than the legal guidelines recommend or allow. On the other extreme, jurors may feel sympathy, relating with the perpetrator on a level not experienced by policymakers, leading to a milder verdict than legally appropriate or allowable.

Typically in crime investigations, law enforcement forces conceal any information regarding the identities of the suspects until they have strong evidence that the suspects are credible. When identities of suspects are revealed through description of their features or release of their images, media coverage and public discussion on the issue grows. On one side, the public discourse can become increasingly negative and hostile, or, if the perpetrator is sympathetic, support for the perpetrator may grow. This is because people experience a greater emotional reaction towards a concrete, identifiable perpetrator than an abstract, unidentifiable one.

Brady Bill 
James S. Brady, the then-White House press secretary, was among three collateral damage victims in the attempted assassination of President Reagan in 1981. Brady was explicitly named in reports of the shooting in contrast to the other two injured, a District of Columbia police officer and a Secret Service agent. The political reaction was largely focused on the injuries of Brady which led to the enactment of the Brady Handgun Violence Prevention Act of 1993. It states that it is mandatory for firearm dealers to perform background searches on firearm purchasers.

Business ethics 

According to a 2016 study by Yam and Reynolds, the growing absence of the identifiable victim effect in the business world may contribute to an increase in unethical business behavior. With an increasingly globalized business framework, the identifiable victim effect may become naturally mediated, freeing business leaders and employees alike to engage in unethical behavior without guilt or emotional distress. This may be possible because globalization results in less face-to-face contact, decreasing the identifiability of possible victims. Research suggests that business leaders, as well as workers, are more likely to engage in unethical behavior when the victims of their behavior are anonymous. At the executive level, one possible result of this is worker commodification and exploitation. At the worker level, employees of a company are possibly more likely to steal from the company or lie on a report if they do not believe this behavior will negatively affect a recognizable coworker. A decrease in recognizable coworkers could thus potentially lead to an increase in unethical behavior by workers. Research also suggests that outside observers, not only perpetrators, view unethical behavior as less unethical if the victim of the unethical behavior is unidentified. This could possibly result in less public outcry against unethical practices in a globalized business environment, where the victims are often unseen.

Moderating factors

Attachment anxiety 

High levels of attachment anxiety may increase the power of identifiable victim effect. Research indicates that individuals with high levels of attachment anxiety may donate more to identified victims and donate less to unidentified victims than the average person. According to a study by Kogut and Kogut, attachment anxiety may reduce the expression of altruistic tendencies, commonly demonstrated by charitable giving. Researchers hypothesize that this is because anxiously attached individuals focus their time and energy on dealing with their own vulnerabilities, leaving them no mental energy to focus on the well-being of others. However, this would only be true of the unidentified individual. When faced with an identified victim, individuals who are anxiously attached tend to donate more money than the average individual. This aligns with past research indicating that anxiously attached people experience significantly more personal distress than those securely attached when confronted with victims in need.

Although anxiously attached people may participate in prosocial behaviors, such as donating money to a charity, their actions are suggested not to be the result of altruistic tendencies, but instead "positively correlated with egoistic, rather than altruistic motives for helping and volunteering". Thus, researchers hypothesize that anxiously attached individuals are more likely to help identified victims only because they will personally benefit. This is possibly because the identified victim can fulfill the desire for personal attachment, not because the victim is in need. It is important to note that their increased helpfulness only extends to easy, effortless actions, such as donating money. It does not extend to particularly difficult or effortful actions, such as donating time.

Guilt 

Research suggests that guilt reduces the power of the identifiable victim effect. Before engaging in a behavior, an individual conducts an assessment of the possible emotional outcomes of that behavior. An individual is drawn towards behaviors that would make them happy and repulsed by those that would make them upset. Thus, a person with a high level of guilt is drawn towards altruistic acts because they serve to alleviate the negative emotions that they are experiencing. Consequently, the presence of guilt may actually increase the occurrence of altruistic behavior, such as charitable donations, regardless of whether the victim they are helping is identified or not. Research also suggests that anticipated guilt reduces the occurrence of unethical behavior that may negatively affect an identified victim. This may be because knowingly and negatively affecting a recognizable victim causes the individual engaging in unethical behavior to experience distress and negative emotions.

Reasoning style 

Research suggests that individual differences in reasoning style moderate the identifiable victim effect. Two different methods of reasoning are “experiential” and “rational”. Experiential thinking (e.g. emotionally-based thinking) is automatic, contextual and fluid, and rational thinking (e.g. logically based thinking) is deliberative, analytical, and decontextualized. Experiential thinking styles may increase the power of the identifiable victim effect, and rational thinking styles may decrease the power of the identifiable victim effect. Researchers theorize that these differences result because experiential thinkers rely on emotional responses towards an issue when making a decision. In contrast, rational thinkers analyze the situation as a whole before making a decision. Thus, a person thinking rationally would respond to all victims equally, not giving preference to those specifically named or otherwise identified, just as experiential thinkers would be drawn towards the more emotionally charged identified victim. However, research conducted during the COVID-19 pandemic found that identifiable victim effects on public health promoting behaviors were not only undetected, but also not mediated by behavioral tests of reasoning style.

Criticism 
The identifiable victim effect has been contested in academia. Critics argue that, when a victim is identified, information such as age and gender of the victim are revealed and people are especially sympathetic in response to that information rather than to identifiability per se.

In 2003, Deborah Small and George Loewenstein conducted an experiment that mitigated this issue. Identifiability was strictly limited to the determination of the victim's identity. Therefore, the victim had already been identified regardless of whether the participants had known anything specific about their identity or not. The circumstances of the victim were more palpable and thus elicited greater sympathy from participants. In contrast, the identities of statistical victims were not yet determined. As such, participants found it more difficult to sympathize with indeterminate victims.

Identification 

In certain situations, identification of a victim can actually reduce the amount of help offered to that individual. Research suggests that if an individual is seen as responsible for their plight, people are less likely to offer help than if the victim was not identified at all. Most research dedicated to the identifiable victim effect avoids the topic of blame, using explicitly blameless individuals, such as children suffering from an illness. However, there are real-world situations where victims may be seen as to blame for their current situation. For example, in a 2011 study by Kogut, individuals were less likely to offer help to an AIDS victim if the victim had contracted AIDS through sexual contact than if the individual was born with AIDS. In other words, individuals were less likely to offer help to victims if they were seen as at least partially responsible for their plight. A meta-study conducted in 2016 supports these findings, reporting that charitable donations were highest when the victim showed little responsibility for their victimization.

In such cases where victim blaming is possible, identification of individuals may not induce sympathy and may actually increase negative perception of the victim. This reduction in help is even more pronounced if the individual believes in the just world hypothesis, which is the tendency for people to blame the victim for what has happened to them. This pattern of blame results from a desire to believe that the world is predictable and orderly and that those who suffer must have done something to deserve their suffering.

Individual applicability  

Research may indicate that the identifiable victim effect only affects identified individuals, not identified groups. A 2005 study by Kogut and Ritov asked participants how much they would be willing to donate to either a critically ill child or a group of eight critically ill children. Although identification of the individual child increased donations, identification of the group of children as a whole did not. Researchers also found that, although both the individual and group evoked similar amounts of empathy, individual victims evoked more emotional distress than groups of victims. Continuing from this, researchers hypothesized that emotional distress, not empathy, appears to be positively correlated with desire to help, or “willingness to contribute.” This supports the idea that altruistic acts may serve as coping mechanisms to alleviate negative emotions, such as guilt. This also supports earmelier research that suggests distress and sympathy are the driving emotional factors behind the identifiable victim effect.

See also 
Compassion fade
List of cognitive biases
 Moral psychology

References 

Cognitive biases
Giving
Behavioral finance
Moral psychology
Social problems in medicine